The Japanese pond turtle (Mauremys japonica), also called commonly the Japanese pond terrapin and the Japanese pond tortoise, is a species of turtle in the family Geoemydidae endemic to Japan. Its Japanese name is nihon ishigame, Japanese stone turtle. Its population has decreased somewhat due to habitat loss, but it is not yet considered a threatened species.

This species is known to hybridize with the Chinese pond turtle, the Chinese stripe-necked turtle, and the Chinese box turtle (and possibly other Geoemydidae) in captivity. As these three species are much rarer and strongly declining in the wild, this should be avoided.

The Japanese pond turtle is an aquatic species found in many freshwater bodies of water. These include rivers, lakes, ponds, swamps, marshes, and irrigated rice paddies in the flatlands surrounding highlands. Although they can be found on both flatlands and on the slopes of the mountains, studies have shown they are more likely to thrive on the flatlands. This can be essential to understanding the conservation measures needed to protect this near-threatened species.

References

 (1989). Turtles of the World. Smithsonian Institution Press, Washington, D.C.
 (1996). Practical Encyclopedia of Keeping and Breeding Tortoises and Freshwater Turtles. Carapace Press, London, England.
 (1979). Encyclopedia of Turtles. TFH Publications, Neptune, New Jersey.
 Spinks, Phillip Q.; Shaffer, Bradley H.; Iverson, John B. & McCord, William P. (2004).  Phylogenetic hypotheses for the turtle family Geomydidae. Molecular Phylogenetics and Evolution 32, 164–182. Academic Press, Cambridge:MA.
Kagayama, S. (2020). Geographic Variation in the Growth of Japanese pond turtles, Maureys japonica, in the Flatland and mountain regions of Chiba Prefecture, Japan. Current Herpetology, 39(2), 87. https://doi.org/10.5358/hsj.39.87 
Kagayama, S. (2022). Life history stage and sex-specific survival rates for the Japanese pond turtle, mauremys japonica, in the foothill region of Chiba Prefecture, Japan. Current Herpetology, 41(1). https://doi.org/10.5358/hsj.41.138 
Suzuki, D., & Hikida, T. (2011). Mitochondrial phylogeography of the Japanese pond turtle, Mauremys japonica (Testudines, Geoemydidae). Journal of Zoological Systematics and Evolutionary Research, 49(2), 141–147. https://doi.org/10.1111/j.1439-0469.2010.00577.x 
Yasukawa, Y., Yabe, T., & Ota, H. (2008). Mauremys japonica (Temminck and Schlegel 1835) – Japanese pond turtle. Chelonian Research Monographs. https://doi.org/10.3854/crm.5.003.japonica.v1.2008

External links

 Mauremys japonica, The Reptile Database

Mauremys
Endemic reptiles of Japan
Reptiles described in 1835
Taxonomy articles created by Polbot